Kareylen Skarleth Capdevilla Briceño (born 3 September 2001) is a Venezuelan footballer who plays as a defender for the Venezuela women's national team.

Early life
Capdevilla was born in San Felipe, Yaracuy.

Club career
Capdevilla has played for Yaracuyanos FC, Arroceros de Calabozo and Estudiantes de Guárico in Venezuela and for Villarreal CF in Spain.

International career
Capdevilla made her senior debut for Venezuela on 8 April 2021.

References

External links
Kareylen Capdevilla at BDFútbol

2001 births
Living people
People from San Felipe, Venezuela
Venezuelan women's footballers
Women's association football defenders
Villarreal CF (women) players
Segunda Federación (women) players
Venezuela women's international footballers
Venezuelan expatriate women's footballers
Venezuelan expatriate sportspeople in Spain
Expatriate women's footballers in Spain